Horace Horton Stanway (11 November 1908 – 10 August 1994) was an Australian rules footballer who played with Footscray and Richmond in the Victorian Football League (VFL).

Notes

External links 
		

1908 births
1994 deaths
Australian rules footballers from Victoria (Australia)
Western Bulldogs players
Richmond Football Club players